Rafiqur Rahaman is an Indian politician belonging  to All India Trinamool Congress. He was elected as a member of West Bengal Legislative Assembly from Amdanga in 2011, 2016 and 2021.

References

Living people
Trinamool Congress politicians from West Bengal
West Bengal MLAs 2011–2016
West Bengal MLAs 2016–2021
Year of birth missing (living people)